The Test is a 1916 American silent drama film directed by George Fitzmaurice and starring Jane Grey, Lumsden Hare and Claude Fleming.

Cast
 Jane Grey as Emma Tretman 
 Lumsden Hare as Arthur Thome 
 Claude Fleming as Freddie Wayne 
 Carl Harbaugh as Richard Tretman 
 Inez Buck as Thome's Sister 
 Ida Darling

References

Bibliography
James Robert Parish & Michael R. Pitts. Film directors: a guide to their American films. Scarecrow Press, 1974.

External links
 

1916 films
1916 drama films
1910s English-language films
American silent feature films
Silent American drama films
American black-and-white films
Films directed by George Fitzmaurice
Pathé Exchange films
1910s American films